J. Chitharanjan (22 October 1927 – 13 June 2008) was an Indian labor leader, politician, a leader of the Communist Party of India (CPI). He was the president of CPI's Trade Union wing AITUC, a Minister in the state and was a member of the Rajya Sabha.

Chitharanjan was elected to Kerala Assembly in 1977, 1980 and 1987 from his home district of Kollam.

His parents were Janardhanan Asan and Meenakshi Amma. His electoral life started with a contest with his uncle Divakarappanikker who was an important Congress leader.

References

1927 births
2008 deaths
Communist Party of India politicians from Kerala
Members of the Kerala Legislative Assembly
Rajya Sabha members from Kerala
Trade unionists from Kerala